Lui Kam Chi (born 24 February 1973) is a Hong Kong rower. He competed at the 1992 Summer Olympics and the 2000 Summer Olympics. He was the winner of a bronze medal at the 1999 Asian Rowing Championships and silver medals in multiple events at the 2001 East Asian Games. He later competed in dragon boat at the 2010 Asian Games and at the 2012 Asian Beach Games.

References

External links
 

1973 births
Living people
Hong Kong male rowers
Olympic rowers of Hong Kong
Rowers at the 1992 Summer Olympics
Rowers at the 2000 Summer Olympics
Rowers at the 1994 Asian Games
Rowers at the 1998 Asian Games
Dragon boat racers at the 2010 Asian Games
Place of birth missing (living people)
Asian Games competitors for Hong Kong
20th-century Hong Kong people
21st-century Hong Kong people